La Morocha is a 1958 Argentine film, which was actually filmed in 1955. Due to the military coup d'état which ended the presidency of Juan Perón, the film was not released until 1958. The film is in black and white, directed by  Ralph Pappier and written by Sixto Pondal Ríos and Carlos Olivari and the premier date was on 30 January 1958. The stars were Tita Merello, Alfredo Alcón, Luis Arata y Rolando Chávez. This was the last film of  Luis Arata.

Synopsis
A prostitute girl helps a student to finish school even though he has a greedy uncle.

Cast
 Tita Merello		
 Alfredo Alcón		
 Luis Arata		
 Rolando Chávez		
 Héctor Calcaño		
 Yuki Nambá		
 Carlos Barbetti		
 Fernando Salas		
 Eduardo de Labar		
 Miguel Dante		
 Nicolás Taricano		
 Cayetano Biondo		
 Diego Marcote		
 Alberto Quiles		
 Armando Lopardo		
 Raquel Cariboni		
 Aurelia Ferrer		
 Susana Vargas		
 Julio Bianquet		
 Rafael Diserio		
 Francisco Iriarte		
 Teresa Blasco		
 Mercedes Llambí

References

External links
 

1958 films
1950s Spanish-language films
Argentine black-and-white films
1950s Argentine films